The Khojaly-Gadabay culture, also known as the Ganja-Karabakh culture  is an archaeological culture of the Late Bronze Age to Early Iron Age (roughly 13th to 7th centuries BC) in the Karabakh region of Transcaucasia. The eponymous sites are at Khojaly, Gadabay and Ganja in Azerbaijan.

It was excavated by Soviet archaeologists beginning in the 1920s.

It was described by Boris Piotrovsky and other archaeologists specializing in the prehistory of Transcaucasia during the 1930s to 1970s.

Gallery

References

1920s archaeological discoveries
Archaeological cultures of the Caucasus
Archaeological cultures of West Asia
Bronze Age cultures of Asia
Iron Age cultures of Asia
Archaeological cultures in Azerbaijan
Prehistoric Azerbaijan